The Toronto Camera Club (TCC) is the oldest photography club in Canada, founded in 1888. It aims "to study and promote the art of photography in all its branches". It is situated in Toronto.

Starting life as a specialized section of the Royal Canadian Institute (RCI), the Photographic Section became an independent organization in 1888. Originally named the Toronto Amateur Photographic Association, the organization changed its name to the Toronto Camera Club in 1891. That year the club began showing exhibits of members' work.

The club held its first "Toronto International Salon of Photography" in May of 1892 with 99 prints exhibited. By 1929 the Salon received over 1,200 entries from 35 countries. That year 370 prints were selected for exhibition.

In 1895 the club allowed women to join with limited privileges. In 1942 the TCC began accepting women for membership with full privileges. In 1952 the club elected Evelyn Andrus as its first woman president.

Affiliations
The Toronto Camera Club is affiliated with the Canadian Association for Photographic Art (CAPA), the Photographic Society of America (PSA), and the Ontario Council of Camera Clubs (OCCC).

References

Further reading
 The first hundred years: An historical portrait of the Toronto Camera Club by Andrew Oliver 

Photography organizations established in the 19th century
Organizations based in Toronto
Canadian photography organizations
Photography in Canada